The following is a non-comprehensive list of high schools in Japan:

Prefecture

Hokkaidō
:ja:北海道高等学校一覧
, Kushiro
Fuji Women's Academy
Hakodate La Salle Junior High School & Senior High School
Hokkaido Asahikawa Higashi High School
Hokkaido Asahikawa Kita High School
Hokkaido Asahikawa Nishi High School
Hokkaido Bihoro High School
Hokkaido Bifuka High School
Hokkaido Hakodate Chubu High School
Hokkaido Engaru High School
Hokkaido Esashi High School
Hokkaido Iwamizawa Higashi High School
Hokkaido Kaminokuni High School
Hokkaido Kitahiroshima High School
Hokkaido Kitami Hokuto High School
Hokkaido Korean Primary, Middle and High School
Hokkaido Kushiro Koryo High School
Hokkaido Matsumae High School
Hokkaido Muroran Sakae High School
Hokkaido Nakashibetsu High School
Hokkaido Nemuro High School
Hokkaido Obihiro Hakuyou High School
Hokkaido Obihiro Sanjyo High School
Hokkaido Otaru Choryo High school
Hokkaido Rausu High School
Hokkaido Rebun High School
Hokkaido Sapporo Asahigaoka High School
Hokkaido Sapporo Higashi High School
Hokkaido Sapporo Intercultural and Technological High School
Hokkaido Sapporo Kaisei High School
Hokkaido Sapporo Minami High School
Hokkaido Sapporo Nishi High School
Hokkaido Sapporo Teine High School
Hokkaido Sapporo Tsukisamu High School
Hokkaido Shibetsu High School
Hokkaido Sunagawa High School
Hokkaido Takikawa High School
Hokkaido Wakkanai High School
Hokurei Junior & Senior High School
Iai Joshi Women's Academy
Sapporo Daiichi High School
Sapporo Odori High School

Aomori
:ja:青森県高等学校一覧

Iwate
:ja:岩手県高等学校一覧

Karuma High School (the school Karasuno Miyagi was based on)
:ja:宮城県高等学校一覧

Akita
:ja:秋田県高等学校一覧
Akita High School
Noshiro Technical High School

Yamagata
:ja:山形県高等学校一覧

Fukushima
:ja:福島県高等学校一覧

Ibaraki
:ja:茨城県高等学校一覧

Tochigi
:ja:栃木県高等学校一覧

Gunma
:ja:群馬県高等学校一覧

Saitama

Chiba

Tokyo

Kanagawa
:ja:神奈川県高等学校一覧

Niigata
:ja:新潟県高等学校一覧

Toyama
:ja:富山県高等学校一覧

Ishikawa
:ja:石川県高等学校一覧

Fukui
List of high schools in Fukui Prefecture

Yamanashi
:ja:山梨県高等学校一覧

Nagano
:ja:長野県高等学校一覧
UWC ISAK Japan

Gifu
:ja:岐阜県高等学校一覧

Shizuoka
:ja:静岡県高等学校一覧

Aichi
:ja:愛知県高等学校一覧

Prefectural 

 Asahigaoka High School
 Meiwa High School
 Chikusa High School
 Tokoname High School
 Yokosuka High School
 Handa High School

Mie
:ja:三重県高等学校一覧

Shiga
:ja:滋賀県高等学校一覧

Kyoto
:ja:京都府高等学校一覧

National
Senior High School Attached to Kyoto University of Education

Prefectural
Sagano High School

Private
Kyoto Gaidai Nishi High School 
Kyoto Tachibana Senior High School
Nihongo Center Japanese Language School 
Rakunan Senior High School 
Ritsumeikan Senior High School .

Osaka
:ja:大阪府高等学校一覧

National
Hirano High School attached to Osaka Kyoiku University 
Ikeda Senior High school Attached to Osaka Kyoiku University 
Tennoji High School attached to Osaka Kyoiku University

Prefectural
 Osaka Prefectural Kaifukan High School
 Osaka Prefectural Kitano High School
 Osaka Prefectural Shimizudani High School

Private
Osaka Seiko Gakuin 
PL Gakuen Senior High School
Seifu Junior/Senior High School 清風中学校・高等学校

Hyōgo
Hōtoku Gakuen High School
:ja:兵庫県高等学校一覧
Hyogo Prefectural Harima-Minami High School 
Hyogo Prefectural Kobe High School

Private
Hakuryo Senior High School 
Koyo Gakuin High School 
Nada Junior and Senior high school 
Kobe Ryūkoku Junior High School, High School

Nara
Todaiji Gakuen (founded by Tōdai-ji temple in 1926)
:ja:奈良県高等学校一覧

Wakayama
:ja:和歌山県高等学校一覧

Tottori
:ja:鳥取県高等学校一覧

Shimane
:ja:島根県高等学校一覧

Private

Prefectural
 Daito Senior High School
 Gotsu Senior High School
 Hamada Senior High School
 Hirata Senior High School
 Iinan Senior High School
 Izumo Senior High School
 Kawamoto Senior High School
 Masuda Senior High School
 Matsue Higashi Senior High School
 Matsue Kita Senior High School
 Matsue Minami Senior High School
 Mitoya Senior High School
 Nima Senior High School
 Ohchi Senior High School
 Ohda Senior High School
 Oki Senior High School
 Oki Shimamae Senior High School
 Taisya Senior High School
 Tsuwano Senior High School
 Yakami Senior High School
 Yasugi Senior High School
 Yokota Senior High School
 Yoshiga Senior High School
 Hamada Commercial High School
 Izumo Commercial High School
 Matsue Commercial High School
 Izumo Technical High School

Okayama
:ja:岡山県高等学校一覧

Hiroshima
:ja:広島県高等学校一覧

Yamaguchi
:ja:山口県高等学校一覧

Tokushima
:ja:徳島県高等学校一覧
Joto High School
Kita High School

Kagawa
:ja:香川県高等学校一覧

Ehime
:ja:愛媛県高等学校一覧
Ehime Prefectural Matsuyama Central Senior High School
Ehime Prefectural Matsuyama Higashi High School
Ehime Prefectural Mishima High School
Ehime Prefectural Uwajima Fisheries High School

Kochi
:ja:高知県高等学校一覧

Fukuoka
:ja:福岡県高等学校一覧
Fukuoka Daiichi High School
Fukuoka Prefectural Fukuoka High School
Fukuoka Prefectural Shuyukan High School

Kumamoto
:ja:熊本県高等学校一覧

Saga
 Chienkan
 Saga Higashi High School
 Saga Technical High School
 Taku Senior High School
:ja:佐賀県高等学校一覧

Nagasaki
:ja:長崎県高等学校一覧

Oita
:ja:大分県高等学校一覧

Miyazaki
:ja:宮崎県高等学校一覧

Kagoshima
:ja:鹿児島県高等学校一覧

Public
 Kagoshima Prefectural Tsurumaru (Senior) High School
 Kagoshima Prefectural Konan (Senior) High School
 Kagoshima Prefectural Kagoshima Chuo (Senior) High School
 Kagoshima Prefectural Kinkowan (Senior) High School
 Kagoshima Prefectural Takeokadai (Senior) High School
 Kagoshima Prefectural Kaiyo (Senior) High School
 Kagoshima Prefectural Meiokan (Senior) High School
 Kagoshima Prefectural Shoyo (Senior) High School
 Kagoshima Prefectural Kagoshima Higashi (Senior) High School
 Kagoshima Prefectural Technical (Senior) High School
 Kagoshima Prefectural Kagoshima Minami (Senior) High School
 (Kagoshima Municipal) Kagoshima Gyokuryu Junior and Senior High School
 (Kagoshima Municipal) Kagoshima Commercial (Senior) High School
 (Kagoshima Municipal) Kagoshima Girls' (Senior) High School
 Kagoshima Prefectural Fukiage (Senior) High School
 Kagoshima Prefectural Ijuin (Senior) High School
 Kagoshima Prefectural Ichiki Agricultural & Horticultural (Senior) High School
 Kagoshima Prefectural Kushikino (Senior) High School
 Kagoshima Prefectural Ibusuki (Senior) High School
 Kagoshima Prefectural Yamakawa (Senior) High School
 Ibusuki Municipal Ibusuki Commercial (Senior) High School
 Kagoshima Prefectural Ei (Senior) High School
 Kagoshima Prefectural Makurazaki (Senior) High School
 Kagoshima Prefectural Kagoshima Fisheries (Senior) High School
 Kagoshima Prefectural Kaseda (Senior) High School
 Kagoshima Prefectural Kaseda Jojun (Senior) High School
 Kagoshima Prefectural Kawanabe (Senior) High School
 Kagoshima Prefectural Satsunan Technical (Senior) High School
 Kagoshima Prefectural Sendai (Senior) High School
 Kagoshima Prefectural Sendai Shoko (Senior) High School
 Kagoshima Prefectural Sensatsu Seishukan (Senior) High School
 Kagoshima Prefectural Satsuma Chuo (Senior) High School
 Kagoshima Prefectural Kakusho (Senior) High School
 Kagoshima Prefectural Noda Girls' (Senior) High School
 Kagoshima Prefectural Izumi (Senior) High School
 Kagoshima Prefectural Izumi Technical (Senior) High School
 Izumi Municipal Izumi Shogyo (Senior) High School
 Kagoshima Prefectural Okuchi (Senior) High School
 Kagoshima Prefectural Isa Agricultural and Forestry (Senior) High School
 Kagoshima Prefectural Kajiki (Senior) High School
 Kagoshima Prefectural Kajiki Technical (Senior) High School
 Kagoshima Prefectural Kamou (Senior) High School
 Kagoshima Prefectural Kokubu (Senior) High School
 Kagoshima Prefectural Fukuyama (Senior) High School
 Kagoshima Prefectural Kirishima (Senior) High School
 Kirishima Municipal Kokubu Chuo (Senior) High School
 Kagoshima Prefectural So (Senior) High School
 Kagoshima Prefectural Shibushi (Senior) High School
 Kagoshima Prefectural Kushira Commercial (Senior) High School
 Kagoshima Prefectural Nanshun Junior and Senior High School
 Kagoshima Prefectural Kanoya (Senior) High School
 Kagoshima Prefectural Kanoya Agricaltural (Senior) High School
 Kagoshima Prefectural Kanoya Technical (Senior) High School
 Kanoya Municipal Kanoya Girls' (Senior) High School
 Kagoshima Prefectural Tarumizu (Senior) High School
 Kagoshima Prefectural Minamiosumi (Senior) High School
 Kagoshima Prefectural Tanegashima (Senior) High School
 Kagoshima Prefectural Tanegashima Chuo (Senior) High School
 Kagoshima Prefectural Yakushima (Senior) High School
 Kagoshima Prefectural Oshima (Senior) High School
 Kagoshima Prefectural Amami (Senior) High School
 Kagoshima Prefectural Oshima Kita (Senior) High School
 Kagoshima Prefectural Koniya (Senior) High School
 Kagoshima Prefectural Kikai (Senior) High School
 Kagoshima Prefectural Tokunoshima (Senior) High School
 Kagoshima Prefectural Okinoerabu (Senior) High School
 Kagoshima Prefectural Yoron (Senior) High School

Private
 Shonan (Senior) High School
 Kagoshima Jitsugyo (Senior) High School
 Kagoshima (Senior) High School
 Kagoshima Immaculate Heart Girls' Junior and Senior High School
 La Salle Junior and Senior High School
 Kagoshima Joho (Senior) High School
 Ikeda Junior and Senior High School
 Kagoshima Shugakukan Junior and Senior High School
 Shigakukan Junior and Senior High School
 Kagoshima Josei (Senior) High School
 Kamimura Gakuen Junior and Senior High School
 Kagoshima Ikueikan Junior and Senior High School
 Hooh (Senior) High School
 Izumi Chuo High School
 Reimei Junior and Senior High School
 Okuchi Meiko Gakuen Junior and Senior High School
 Ryuo (Senior) High School
 Kagoshima Daiichi Junior and Senior High School
 Kanoya Chuo (Senior) High School
 Shoshikan (Senior) High School
 Shonan Daini (Senior) High School
 Yakushima Ohzora (Senior) High School

Okinawa
 Natsu

Prefectural
hokkaido elementary 
Chatan Senior High School
 Futenma Senior High School
 Ginowan Senior High School
 Gushikawa Senior High School
 Ishikawa Senior High School
 Itoman Senior High School
 Kadena Senior High School
 Kaiho Senior High School
 Kitanakagusuku Senior High School
 Koza Senior High School
 Kumejima Senior High School
 Kyuyo Senior High School
 Maehara Senior High School
 Mawashi Senior High School
 Misato Senior High School
 Miyako Senior High School
 Nago Senior High School
 Naha Senior High School
 Naha Nishi Senior High School
 Oroku Senior High School
 Shonan Senior High School
 Shuri Senior High School
 Shuri Higashi Senior High School
 Tomari Senior High School
 Tominan Senior High School
 Tomishiro Senior High School
 Urasoe Senior High School
 Yaeyama Senior High School
 Yomei Senior High School
 Chūbu Agricultural High School
 Hokubu Agricultural High School
 Miyako Agricultural High School
 Nanbu Agricultural High School
 Yaeyama Agricultural High School
 Chūbu Commercial High School
 Gushikawa Commercial High School
 Nago Commercial High School
 Naha Commercial High School
 Urasoe Commercial High School
 Yaeyama Commercial High School
 Okinawa Fisheries High School
 Naha International High School
 Chūbu Technical High School
 Hokubu Technical High School
 Misato Technical High School
 Miyako Technical High School
 Naha Technical High School
 Okinawa Technical High School
 Urasoe Technical High School

Technical High Schools
:ja:工業高等学校一覧

See also
Secondary education in Japan

 
High schools